Flo is an American sitcom television series and a spin-off of Alice that aired on CBS from March 24, 1980, to June 30, 1981. The series starred Polly Holliday reprising her role as sassy and street-smart waitress Florence Jean "Flo" Castleberry who returns to her hometown of Fort Worth, Texas—referred to as "Cowtown"—and becomes the proprietor of a rundown old roadhouse that she renames "Flo's Yellow Rose". Although the series started strong—in the Top 10 during its short first season run—repeated timeslot changes resulted in it falling out of the Top 40 shows by mid-March 1981.  It was subsequently not renewed when CBS announced its 1981 fall lineup at the May upfronts.

Synopsis
After four seasons as a waitress at Mel's Diner on Alice, Flo is on her way to a new restaurant hostess job in Houston, Texas as described in her final appearance, "Flo's Farewell" (season 4, episode 18). She stops to visit her family in her hometown of Cowtown, Texas (Cowtown is the popular nickname of Fort Worth) and in a fit of nostalgia, Flo buys a rundown old roadhouse she had enjoyed in her formative years and renames it "Flo's Yellow Rose". Coping with chauvinistic bartender Earl (Geoffrey Lewis) and the greedy and obnoxious banker Farley (Jim B. Baker) who holds the mortgage, as well as her mother Velma (Sudie Bond) and straight-laced sister Fran (Lucy Lee Flippin), causes most of the conflict in the series.

The rest of Flo's staff at the Yellow Rose includes her childhood best friend Miriam (Joyce Bulifant) as waitress/bookkeeper, and chain-smoking piano player Les (Stephen Keep). Randy, the mechanic (Leo Burmester) who worked at the garage next door, and Chester (Mickey Jones), were regular customers. Vic Tayback made one guest appearance as Mel Sharples from Alice. Once Flo began, Polly Holliday never appeared again on Alice, except in flashback clips in the last episode.

Cast
 Polly Holliday as Florence Jean "Flo" Castleberry
 Geoffrey Lewis as Earl Tucker
 Jim B. Baker as Farley Waters
 Sudie Bond as Mama Velma Castleberry
 Leo Burmester as Randy Stumphill
 Joyce Bulifant as Miriam Willoughby
 Lucy Lee Flippin as Fran Castleberry
 Stephen Keep as Les Kincaid
 George Flower as Roy
 Mickey Jones as Chester
 Terry Willis as Wendell Tubbs (1980)

Theme song
The theme song, "Flo's Yellow Rose", written by Fred Werner and Susie Glickman, was sung by Hoyt Axton who would co-star with Holliday in the 1984 film Gremlins.

Broadcast history
Flo was broadcast in these following timeslots during its two-season run on CBS:

March 1980 – April 1980: Monday 9:30–10:00 p.m.
July 1980 – January 1981: Monday 8:00–8:30 p.m.
February 1981: Saturday 9:00–9:30 p.m.
March 1981 – May 1981: Saturday 8:30–9:00 p.m.
June 1981 – July 1981: Tuesday 8:30–9:00 p.m.

Episodes

Season 1 (1980)

Season 2 (1980–81)

Reception and cancellation
The short first season (spring 1980) was a ratings success ranking at No. 7 and had 24.4 million viewer average. The following season brought a sharp decline in numbers (due to repeated timeslot changes), and CBS opted to not renew the series for a third season.

Award nominations
Nominated: 1980 Primetime Emmy Award – Outstanding Lead Actress in a Comedy Series (Polly Holliday)
Nominated: 1981 Golden Globe Award – Best Performance by an Actress in a Television Series – Comedy or Musical (Polly Holliday)
Nominated: 1981 Golden Globe Award – Best Supporting Actor in a Series, Miniseries or Motion Picture Made for Television (Geoffrey Lewis)

Home media release
On November 5, 2013, Flo: The Complete Series was released on DVD in Region 1 by Warner Home Video via their Warner Archive Collection. This is a Manufacture-on-Demand (MOD) release available via WBShop.com & Amazon.com.

Book
A book chronicling the development of the TV series Alice and Flo entitled Alice: Life Behind the Counter in Mel's Greasy Spoon (A Guide to the Feature Film, the TV Series, and More) was published by BearManor Media in September 2019.
Flo was also considered in the book Single Season Sitcoms of the 1980s by Bob Leszczak, published by McFarland in 2016.

Notes

External links
 

1980 American television series debuts
1981 American television series endings
1980s American sitcoms
1980s American workplace comedy television series
CBS original programming
English-language television shows
American television spin-offs
Television shows set in Fort Worth, Texas
Television shows set in Texas
Television series by Warner Bros. Television Studios